The murder of Lauren Giddings was perpetrated by Stephen McDaniel on June 26, 2011 in Macon, Georgia. The victim, Lauren Giddings, was a recent graduate of Mercer Law School. McDaniel pled guilty to the murder in 2014.

Murder
McDaniel and Giddings lived in neighboring apartments and were former classmates at Mercer University. According to McDaniel, at 4:30 a.m. on Sunday June 26, 2011, he used a master key to gain access to Giddings' apartment. Wearing a mask and gloves, McDaniel strangled her to death with his hands in her bedroom. The next day, he dismembered her body in the bathroom with a hacksaw. Most of Giddings' remains were discarded in a dumpster on campus. However, the torso was thrown in a trashcan outside the apartment complex.

Investigation
Giddings was reported missing on June 30, and her torso was subsequently discovered. That day, McDaniel did an interview with WGXA, claiming to be a concerned friend of Giddings. During the interview he learned that the torso had been recovered.

On July 1, McDaniel voluntarily went to the police office to give a statement about Giddings. His interrogation lasted over 12 hours and his apartment was searched. He was placed in jail on July 2, where he would remain for the next month. In August, McDaniel was charged with murder. Investigators had linked several pieces of evidence to him, including the hacksaw he used to dismember the body.

The rest of Giddings' remains have never been found.

Aftermath
In 2014, McDaniel accepted a plea deal and pleaded guilty to murder. His deal required him to describe his account of the murder, and in exchange, he would avoid the death penalty. The judge also dismissed additional charges discovered during the investigation, including one count of burglary and 30 counts of sexual exploitation of children. He will be eligible for parole in 2041.

In 2018, McDaniel's father, Mark McDaniel, started a GoFundMe campaign to raise funds for the legal expenses needed for an appeal. The page was promptly taken down. Stephen McDaniel represented himself in court while arguing for a retrial in 2018. He stated that his constitutional rights were violated as he was not medically cleared before giving consent for searches, his legal research was intercepted by the district attorney, and his attorneys did not adequately represent him. He also filed a malpractice complaint against his former attorney. The judge denied the appeal.

On May 30, 2022, another habeas corpus petition was filed by McDaniel claiming documents from defense trial preparations were stolen by the district attorney. In his petition, he requested his conviction be overturned and he be released from prison.

References

2011 in Georgia (U.S. state)
2011 murders in the United States
Female murder victims
June 2011 crimes in the United States
Murder in Georgia (U.S. state)